= New York World's Fair =

New York World's Fair may refer to:

- 1939 New York World's Fair
- 1964 New York World's Fair
